"The Day After the Day the Martians Came" is a short story by American writer Frederik Pohl, first published in Harlan Ellison's Dangerous Visions. It shows how humans can (and will) laugh at (and hate) any minority group. It centers on a group of reporters in a bar, shortly after humans have made first contact with Martians, who are passing the time by retelling "dumb Polack" jokes as "dumb Martian" jokes.

"The Day After the Day the Martians Came" was adapted by Marvel Comics in Worlds Unknown #1, May, 1973, illustrated by Ralph Reese.

Pohl followed up the story with "Sad Solarian Screenwriter Sam" in the June 1972 issue of the Magazine of Fantasy and Science Fiction, in which an ambitious Hollywood screenwriter tries to capitalize on the media hype surrounding the discovery of the Martians by pitching a film adaptation of Edgar Rice Burroughs' Barsoom novels (all the while unaware of the unimpressive nature of the actual Martians.)

In the mid-80, Pohl revisited the setting with five new short stories set in the same milieu, which were published in Asimov's, MF&SF, and Omni between 1986 and 1987. All seven stories (plus three additional, previously-unpublished ones and nine very short interstitial vignettes) were collected in a 1988 fix-up novel, The Day the Martians Came.

References

External links 

1967 short stories
Short stories by Frederik Pohl
Dangerous Visions short stories